T. Michael Goodrich is a former CEO and chairman of BE&K. Goodrich joined BE&K in 1972 as Assistant Secretary and General Counsel. In 1989 he was made President and served as Chairman and CEO until 2008.

He is a recipient of the Silver Buffalo and Distinguished Eagle Scout awards from the Boys Scouts of America and sits on that organization's governing board.  He was inducted into the National Academy of Construction in 2002 and the State of Alabama Engineering Hall of Fame in 2004.

Goodrich served of the Board of Directors for the University of Alabama at Birmingham Health System and was also a Trustee of the Eisenhower Exchange Fellowship.

He received a bachelor's degree in civil engineering from Tulane University and a J.D. from the University of Alabama.

References

External links
 Forbes profile
 Tulane University Bio
 profile at Energen
 profile at Alabama Academy of Honor

National Executive Board of the Boy Scouts of America members
Living people
Year of birth missing (living people)